Cera or CERA may refer to:

People 
Michael Cera (born 1988), Canadian actor
Pierluigi Cera (born 1941), Italian footballer
Cera (The Land Before Time), a character from The Land Before Time animated film series

Places 
Cera, Croatia
Cera, Makedonska Kamenica

Other 
Cambridge Energy Research Associates, a consulting firm
Canterbury Earthquake Recovery Authority, a New Zealand public service department coordinating the rebuild of Christchurch after the 2011 earthquake
Catcher's ERA, a baseball statistic
Central Railroad of Indianapolis
Cera (company), British elder care/home care company
Chartered Enterprise Risk Analyst, a designation awarded by the Society of Actuaries
Chinese Empire Reform Association, a reformist political party in the late-Qing Dynasty
Conard Environmental Research Area, a prairie research area affiliated with Grinnell College, near Kellogg, Iowa
Continuous erythropoietin receptor activator, a class of drugs and a variant of erythropoietin (EPO)
Cortical evoked response audiometry, an assessment using auditory evoked potentials
Conservation and Environmental Research Areas of UMBC, protected environmental areas on the University of Maryland, Baltimore County campus
Cera dynasty, an Indian dynasty that ruled over parts of southern India